Brychius hornii is a species of beetle in the genus Brychius that was first described by George Robert Crotch in 1873.

References

Haliplidae
Beetles described in 1873